People's Park is a station on Line 2 of the Chengdu Metro in China. It is located at the northwest corner of People's Park in Qingyang District, Chengdu.

Station layout

Gallery

References

Railway stations in Sichuan
Railway stations in China opened in 2012
Chengdu Metro stations